K. U. Mohanan is an Indian film cinematographer who primarily works in the Bollywood and Malayalam film industries. He is an alumnus of the Film and Television Institute of India, Pune. He has worked in several documentaries and Non feature films in his early days. He is a member of the Indian Society of Cinematographers (ISC).

Filmography

Awards

 Nominated, Filmfare Award for Best Cinematographer (2015) - Miss Lovely
 Nominated, SIIMA Award for Best Cinematographer (2019) - Maharshi
 Kerala State Film Award for Best Cinematography for Carbon in the year 2018.
 Won Golden Sparrow for Best Cinematography at 1st Diorama International Film Festival & Market (2019) - Andhadhun

See also
Indian cinematographers
Cinema of India

References

External links 

K.U. Mohanan Filmography – BFI

Living people
People from Kannur district
Film and Television Institute of India alumni
21st-century Indian photographers
Cinematographers from Kerala
Year of birth missing (living people)
Malayalam film cinematographers